Ampere is a screamo band based in Amherst, Massachusetts known for their short (10–15 minutes) but extremely loud and intense live shows. The band has put the importance of DIY punk ethics at the forefront of their lyrics and are known for the particular attention they bring to their vegan principles.

History
The members of the bands have been involved in the DIY punk scene for a number of years with the most notable being guitarist Will Killingsworth, who played guitar in Orchid, Laceration and Bucket Full of Teeth and who continues to run his Clean Plate record label and Dead Air recording studio where the band records all of their music. He was also in the hardcore "super group" Failures, as well as Vaccine and Won't Belong. Drummer Andy Skelly played drums in both The Last 40 Seconds and Wolves, Stephen's previous bands were Montcalm, The Last 40 Seconds, and 175 Grams.  He concurrently played guitar in self-destructive supergroup Aerosols. He also briefly ran Distort, an independent record store in Northampton, MA (May '06 - December '06).  Meghan played bass in Unicoroner, and sang in Stop The Clock and Relics on their first 7-inch and split 7-inch with Furnace.

Much like Orchid, Ampere (especially earlier albums such as "All our Tomorrows End Today") often borrow some of their lyrics from philosophers and revolutionaries such as Guy Debord. They have preserved some of the "intellectual" punk seen in bands like Orchid, Sinaloa, Native Nod, Current, and others. In all of their endeavors, Ampere has persisted in their commitment to intellect, art, and sincerity.

The band actively tour in the US and completed a tour of Europe with Sinaloa in March 2006. A split record on Ebullition Records between the two bands was released in time for the tour, along with a 7-inch of their early recordings and a four-way split 11-inch with Death to Tyrants, Wasteland and Daniel Striped Tiger which was recorded live at Dead Air. Since then, a split 12-inch composed completely of cover songs was released with Das Oath.

2007 was a productive year for the band, encompassing a brief Japanese tour as well as three new split records; a 6-inch with Ringers on No Idea Records, which, after the first press was re-released as a 7-inch (both versions of the record came with limited runs of T-shirts featuring the album art), a 9-inch with Funeral Diner put out jointly by Clean Plate and The Electric Human Project (this release included intricate etchings between the grooves), and a 7-inch picture disk with France's Daitro on Clean Plate/purepainsugar.

In 2008, an Australian-tour-only split 7-inch with Off Minor was released. Both bands contributed a previously released but compilation-exclusive song from an Animal Rights benefit CD on Exotic Fever. It is Ampere's most limited release to date (aside from the cassette format of the demo tape) at a scant 300 copies. Each band took 150 for their respective jaunts down under and made different packaging.

In June 2011 the band's second LP titled "Like Shadows" was released on No Idea Records.

In August 2015, a split 8" with Italian band Raein was released on No Idea Records.

Pierce and Skelly continue to play together in indie/shoegaze band Kindling, who have a 12" forthcoming in Fall 2015 on No Idea Records.

Killingsworth and Minior also play together in punk band Longings, with an LP coming out on Framework / Echo Canyon Records in September 2015.

Additionally, Killingsworth is a present member of No Faith, Demonbrother, and The Toll.

Minior is also a member of Siamese Twins and Chemiplastica.

Killingsworth and Skelly played together in Ritual Mess with Geoff Garlock and Jayson Green, also of Orchid, and James Clarke.

Members
 Will Killingsworth - guitar
 Meghan Minior - bass
 Stephen Pierce - vocals
 Andy Skelly - drums

Discography
Studio albums
All Our Tomorrows End Today 10-inch/3-inch CD 2004 (Ebullition)
Like Shadows 2011 (No Idea Records)

Splits
Ampere/Wolves Split 7-inch  2003 (Moganono Records)
Ampere/Welcome the Plague Year]] split 5-inch 2005 (Clean Plate/Turnstile)
Ampere/Death to Tyrants/Wasteland/Daniel Striped Tiger split 11-inch 2006 (Clean Plate)
Ampere/Sinaloa Split LP/CD 2006 (Ebullition)
Ampere/Das Oath Split LP+CD 2006 (Self-released)
Ampere/Daitro Split 7-inch picture disc 2007 (Clean Plate/purepainsugar)
Ampere/Ringers Split 6-inch/7-inch 2007 (No Idea Records)
Ampere/Funeral Diner Split 9-inch 2007 (Clean Plate/Electric Human Project)
Ampere/Off Minor Split 7-inch 2008 (Yellow Ghost)
Ampere/Raein Split 2015

Demo and CompilationsDemo 7-inch/Tape 2002 (Self-Released)First Recordings 7-inch(Contains Demo and split with Wolves) 2006 (purepainsugar)The First Five Years CD 2008 (Yellow Ghost)

CompilationKeep Singing! A Benefit Compilation for Compassion Over Killing'' 2008 (Exotic Fever Records)

References

External links
Official Website
Ebullition Records Catalog: Ampere
WFMU Interview w/Will Killingsworth

Musical groups from Massachusetts
American emo musical groups
Musical groups established in 2002
Musical quartets
American screamo musical groups
2002 establishments in Massachusetts